Tomaž Cerkovnik (29 June 1960 – 26 July 2004) was a Slovenian former alpine skier who competed for Yugoslavia in the 1984 Winter Olympics.

External links
 sports-reference.com

1960 births
2004 deaths
Slovenian male alpine skiers
Olympic alpine skiers of Yugoslavia
Alpine skiers at the 1984 Winter Olympics
Skiers from Ljubljana
Universiade medalists in alpine skiing
Universiade silver medalists for Yugoslavia
Competitors at the 1981 Winter Universiade